Božo Broketa (24 December 1922 – 25 July 1985) was a Yugoslav football player.

Club career
He spent most of his career with Hajduk Split. He played 4 league matches for Dutch giants Ajax, when he already was 36 years of age.

A football academy in Dubrovnik is named after him.

International career
He made his debut for Yugoslavia in a May 1947 friendly match away against Czechoslovakia and earned a total of 3 caps, scoring no goals. His final international was a June 1948 Balkan Cup match against Albania. He was also part of Yugoslavia's squad for the football tournament at the 1948 Summer Olympics, but he did not play in any matches.

References 

 "Božo Broketa", Nogometni leksikon, Miroslav Krleža Lexicographical Institute. Zagreb, 2004.

External links
 
 

1922 births
1985 deaths
Sportspeople from Dubrovnik
Association football defenders
Yugoslav footballers
Yugoslavia international footballers
Medalists at the 1948 Summer Olympics
Olympic medalists in football
Olympic footballers of Yugoslavia
Olympic silver medalists for Yugoslavia
Footballers at the 1948 Summer Olympics
1950 FIFA World Cup players
HNK Hajduk Split players
NK GOŠK Dubrovnik players
SV Limburgia players
AFC Ajax players
Yugoslav First League players
Eerste Divisie players
Eredivisie players
Yugoslav expatriate footballers
Expatriate footballers in the Netherlands
Yugoslav expatriate sportspeople in the Netherlands